Electric Love is an electronic dance music festival held annually since 2013. It takes place at the second weekend in July at the Salzburgring in Plainfeld, Austria. Headliners have included Armin van Buuren, Hardwell, Dimitri Vegas & Like Mike, David Guetta, Martin Garrix, Axwell, Sebastian Ingrosso, Tiësto. According to Technoton Magazin, the 2014 festival attracted over 100,000 attendees. It is operated by Revolution Event GmbH.

According to EMF Magazine, the festival is "Austria's leading electronic music festival".

Concept

Location 
The venue of Electric Love Festival is the Salzburgring, a race track opened in 1969 between Koppl and Plainfeld near Salzburg in the lake district of the Salzkammergut. Between 2001 and 2008, the Frequency Festival with 45,000 visitors per day according to the organizers already took place on the grounds. Surrounding cow meadows provided by farmers serve as camping areas.

Stages 
Mainstage: The main stage is located in the paddock of the race track.[10] Headliners from various EDM genres perform here.

Club Circus: This is the largest indoor stage. Since 2016, it has been hosted by the Dutch label Pussy Lounge on one day. In 2022, Blacklist, a series of events at Cologne based club Bootshaus, took over hosting the stage for one day for the first time. Also, the pre-party has been held here since 2015.

Harder Styles: The stage was hosted by Dutch label Q-Dance from 2015 to 2019. It is the second largest stage. Since 2022, the stage has been planned by the organizer itself and has since been called Hard Dance Factory.

Heineken Starclub: A club on the festival grounds where hip-hop and rap-artists perform.

Honeycomb: A techno stage which was used in 2019.

Shutdown Cave: In the "Shutdown Uptempo Cage - BPM Deluxe" the Harder Styles from 200 bpm are played. The name derives from the Shutdown Festival, a hardcore event in Zwentendorf.

Organics Beach: For the first time in 2022, an area on the beach of Fuschlsee opens before the festival. It is a separated event and offers activities such as yoga and creative sessions.

Almhütte: a traditional Austrian après-ski hut with two floors.

Opening Ceremony 
Traditionally, the festival is opened by Electric Love resident Felice, who is accompanied by a local choir and orchestra. In 2019, street performers from all over Europe were part of the show.

Summary 

Due to COVID-19 pandemic the festival got cancelled in 2020 and postponed in 2021 to Aug 26 – Aug 28, 2021 with a special concept of only 10.000 Festival attendees per day.

Awards 

 Live-Entertainment-Award (LEA)
 2018: nominated in category "festival of the year"
 European Festival Awards
 2013: nominated in category "Best new festival" and "Best medium sized festival"
 2015: nominated in category  "Best Major Festival"
 2019: nominated in category  "Best Major Festival"
 Austrian Event Award
 2020: Awarded in Gold nominated in category "event security"

See also

List of electronic music festivals

References

External links

electriclove.at

Music festivals established in 2013
Electronic music festivals in Austria